Morvarid (also Romanized as Morvārīd; also known as Mirvaray, Mīrwarai, and Morvārīyeh) is a village in Bonab Rural District, in the Central District of Zanjan County, Zanjan Province, Iran. At the 2006 census, its population was 459, in 118 families.

References 

Populated places in Zanjan County